Ekaterine Gorgodze was the defending champion, but chose to participate in Warsaw instead.

Barbara Haas won the title, defeating Olga Danilović in the final, 6–2, 6–1.

Seeds

Draw

Finals

Top half

Bottom half

References

Main Draw

Ladies Open Hechingen - Singles